Peter Wentz Farmstead is a historical German American farm which has been continuously farmed since 1744. It is located in Worcester Township, Montgomery County, Pennsylvania near Lansdale.

History
The first family to till this land was Peter and Rosanna Wentz (both 1st generation) and their 6 children. Peter inherited the property from his father who may have purchased it as early as 1710. It was sold to Dewalt Bieber in 1784 and then to Melchior Schultz, a minister of the Schwenkfelder faith, in 1794. Schultz family descendants owned the home until 1969 when it was purchased by the County of Montgomery. The Georgian style mansion was built in 1758, and is a large -story, dwelling with attached summer kitchen and bake oven. The main house consists of two floors with four rooms and a large hallway on both, a cellar with a spring house and a full attic. The front facade is built of dressed red sandstone and the remainder of the building is built on uncut sandstone. Nearby is a red building that has a visitor center with restrooms and a gift-shop and employees offices upstairs. Also on the property, there are many reconstructed outbuildings; Privy, smokehouse, woodshed, ice-house, barn, chicken house and sheepfold. Currently the farm has sheep, cows, pigs, horses and chickens.

The house served as headquarters for the Commander-in-Chief of the Continental Army George Washington before and after the Battle of Germantown, October 2–4 and 16–21, 1777.  His Excellency did not travel alone. He had a staff of 9 military secretaries or aides-de-camp, a dozen servants and his personal guard unit, the Commander-in-Chief's Guard. That unit consisted of 60 infantry soldiers and 3 officers. Washington set his 12,000 strong army 2 miles south on top of the Methacton hill to be in striking distance of the 8,000 Crown forces in nearby Germantown.

By October 20 news arrived that the fortifications and breastworks around Philadelphia were completed, the British abandoned their outpost in Germantown. Washington responded by moving his troops within a half days march of Philadelphia.

It was added to the National Register of Historic Places in 1973.

See also

 National Register of Historic Places in Montgomery County, Pennsylvania
 List of Washington's Headquarters during the Revolutionary War

References

External links

 Peter Wentz Farmstead - official site

Houses on the National Register of Historic Places in Pennsylvania
Georgian architecture in Pennsylvania
Houses completed in 1758
Houses in Montgomery County, Pennsylvania
Museums in Montgomery County, Pennsylvania
Historic house museums in Pennsylvania
National Register of Historic Places in Montgomery County, Pennsylvania
Historic House Museums of the Pennsylvania Germans